In graph theory, a line perfect graph is a graph whose line graph is a perfect graph. Equivalently, these are the graphs in which every odd-length simple cycle is a triangle.

A graph is line perfect if and only if each of its biconnected components is a bipartite graph, the complete graph , or a triangular book . Because these three types of biconnected component are all perfect graphs themselves, every line perfect graph is itself perfect. By similar reasoning, every line perfect graph is a parity graph, a Meyniel graph, and a perfectly orderable graph.

Line perfect graphs generalize the bipartite graphs, and share with them the properties that the maximum matching and minimum vertex cover have the same size, and that the chromatic index equals the maximum degree.

See also
Strangulated graph, a graph in which every peripheral cycle is a triangle

References

Perfect graphs